Macaroni (Italian: maccheroni) is dry pasta shaped like narrow tubes.   Made with durum wheat, macaroni is commonly cut in short lengths; curved macaroni may be referred to as elbow macaroni. Some home machines can make macaroni shapes but, like most pasta, macaroni is usually made commercially by large-scale extrusion. The curved shape is created by different speeds of extrusion on opposite sides of the pasta tube as it comes out of the machine.

The word "macaroni" is often used synonymously with elbow-shaped macaroni, as it is the variety most often used in macaroni and cheese recipes. In Italy and other countries, the noun maccheroni can refer to straight, tubular, square-ended pasta corta ("short-length pasta") or to long pasta dishes, as in maccheroni alla chitarra and frittata di maccheroni, which are prepared with long pasta like spaghetti.
In the United States, federal regulations define three different shapes of dried pasta, such as spaghetti, as a "macaroni product".

Etymology
In Italian, maccheroni refers to elongated pasta, not necessarily in tubular form. This general meaning is still retained outside Rome and in different languages which borrowed the word. In Brazilian Portuguese, Estonian, Greek, Iranian, Russian, Ukrainian, and other Slavic languages, as well as Arabic, Turkish, Kazakh, Azerbaijani, Uzbek, Kyrgyz, and other Turkic languages and some Italian-American dialects the word was adapted as a generic term for all varieties of pasta.

Maccheroni comes from Italian maccheroni , plural form of maccherone. The many varieties sometimes differ from each other because of the texture of each pasta: rigatoni and tortiglioni, for example, have ridges down their lengths, while chifferi, lumache, lumaconi, pipe, pipette, etc. refer to elbow-shaped pasta similar to macaroni in North American culture.

However, the product as well as the name derive from the ancient Greek "Macaria". The academic consensus supports that the word is derived from the Greek μακαρία (makaría), a kind of barley broth which was served to commemorate the dead. In turn, that comes from μάκαρες (mákares) meaning the "blessed ones, blessed dead", the plural of μάκαρ (mákar) which means "blessed, happy"; μακάριος (makários, from μάκαρ (mákar) + -ιος (-ios, adjective suffix)) and Μακάριος (Makários) "Makarios (Latinized form: Macarius") are derived terms.

However, the Italian linguist G. Alessio argues that the word can have two origins. The first is the Medieval Greek μακαρώνεια (makarṓneia) "dirge" (stated in sec. XIII by James of Bulgaria), which would mean "funeral meal" and then "food to serve" during this office (see modern Eastern Thrace's  μαχαρωνιά (makharōniá) - macharōnia in the sense of "rice-based dish served at the funeral"), in which case, the term would be composed of the double root of μακάριος (makários) "blessed" and αἰωνίως (aiōníōs) "eternally". The second is the Greek μακαρία (makaría) "barley broth", which would have added the suffix -one.

In his book Delizia! The Epic History of Italians and their Food (2007), John Dickie instead says that the word macaroni, and its earlier variants like maccheroni, "comes from maccare, meaning to pound or crush."

The word first appears in English as makerouns in the 1390 Forme of Cury, which records the earliest recipe for macaroni and cheese. The word later came to be applied to overdressed dandies and was associated with foppish Italian fashions of dress and periwigs, as in the eighteenth-century British song "Yankee Doodle".

Culinary use outside Italy
As is the case with dishes made with other types of pasta, macaroni and cheese is a popular dish and is often made with elbow macaroni. The same dish, known simply as macaroni cheese, is also found in Great Britain, where it originated. In Great Britain, particularly Scotland, macaroni cheese is a popular filling for pies, often consumed as a takeaway food or at football grounds. A sweet macaroni, known as macaroni pudding, containing milk and sugar (and rather similar to a rice pudding) was also popular with the British during the Victorian era.  A popular canned variety is still manufactured by Ambrosia and sold in UK supermarkets.

In areas with large populations open to Western cultural influence such as Hong Kong, Macao, Malaysia and Singapore, the local Chinese have adopted macaroni as an ingredient for Chinese-style Western cuisine. In Hong Kong's cha chaan teng ("tea restaurants") and Southeast Asia's kopi tiam ("coffee shops"), macaroni is cooked in water and then rinsed to remove starch, and served in clear broth with ham or frankfurter sausages, peas, black mushrooms, and optionally eggs, reminiscent of noodle soup dishes. This is often a course for breakfast or light lunch fare. Macaroni has also been incorporated into Malay Malaysian cuisine, where it is stir-fried akin to mee goreng using Asian seasoning similar to said noodle dish (i.e. shallots, oyster sauce and chili paste). In the Philippines, it is a key ingredient in sopas, a semi-clear chicken broth often with chicken meat, pork, carrots, and other vegetables. A common variant uses milk, specifically evaporada.

See also

Kushari - an Egyptian dish made of rice, macaroni and lentils
Macaroni art

References

External links

http://law.justia.com/cfr/title21/21-2.0.1.1.24.html

Types of pasta
Italian cuisine
Neapolitan cuisine